The 1892 Chicago Colts season was the 21st season of the Chicago Colts franchise, their 17th in the National League and the second at South Side Park. In a split season schedule, the Colts finished eighth in the first half of the season and seventh in the second half. Overall, the team had a record of 70–76, seventh-best in the 12-team National League.

Regular season

Season standings

Record vs. opponents

Roster

Player stats

Batting

Starters by position 
Note: Pos = Position; G = Games played; AB = At bats; H = Hits; Avg. = Batting average; HR = Home runs; RBI = Runs batted in

Other batters 
Note: G = Games played; AB = At bats; H = Hits; Avg. = Batting average; HR = Home runs; RBI = Runs batted in

Pitching

Starting pitchers 
Note: G = Games pitched; IP = Innings pitched; W = Wins; L = Losses; ERA = Earned run average; SO = Strikeouts

Other pitchers 
Note: G = Games pitched; IP = Innings pitched; W = Wins; L = Losses; ERA = Earned run average; SO = Strikeouts

Relief pitchers 
Note: G = Games pitched; W = Wins; L = Losses; SV = Saves; ERA = Earned run average; SO = Strikeouts

References

External links 
1892 Chicago Colts season at Baseball Reference

Chicago Cubs seasons
Chicago Colts season
Chicago Cubs